Ruy Bueno Neto, (Belo Horizonte, April 11, 1978) is a Brazilian footballer who currently plays for Alecrim FC Natal. He is famous in Brazil for his large head. This gave him the nickname Ruy Cabeção, meaning Ruy big head.

References

1978 births
Living people
Brazilian footballers
Brazilian expatriate footballers
Boavista Sport Club players
Botafogo de Futebol e Regatas players
América Futebol Clube (MG) players
Cruzeiro Esporte Clube players
Guarani FC players
D.C. United players
Figueirense FC players
Fluminense FC players
Expatriate soccer players in the United States
Grêmio Foot-Ball Porto Alegrense players
Ipatinga Futebol Clube players
Association football defenders
Footballers from Belo Horizonte